Moses L. Frost (1871–1958) was a state senator for Minnesota's 10th district from Jackson, Minnesota. He was born on August 25, 1871 and died on October 3, 1958. He served in the Minnesota Senate from 1927–1930. He was preceded by Charles Gillam and was succeeded by Ole Finstad. In addition to his work in the Senate, Frost served 5 terms as mayor of Jackson.

References

1871 births
1958 deaths
Minnesota state senators
People from Jackson, Minnesota
Mayors of places in Minnesota